The Coorongooba Creek, a perennial stream of the Hawkesbury-Nepean catchment, is located in the Central Tablelands region of New South Wales, Australia.

Course
The river descends  over its  course; and is entirely contained within the Wollemi National Park.

See also

 List of rivers of Australia
 List of rivers of New South Wales (A–K)
 Rivers of New South Wales

References

Rivers of New South Wales
City of Lithgow